Rodrigo Reyes may refer to:

 Rodrigo Reyes (director) (born 1983), Mexican film director
 Rodrigo Reyes (footballer) (born 2001), Mexican footballer